Rwanda competed at the 2012 Summer Paralympics in London, United Kingdom, from 29 August to 9 September 2012.

Team 
Dominique Bizimana served as the President of the National Paralympic Committee of Rwanda in 2012, along with being a member of the men's national sitting volleyball team. The delegation stayed at Cavesson House in the Paralympic Village.

Athletics 

Men's track and road events

Powerlifting 

Men

Volleyball

Men's tournament
The team was the first from Sub-Saharan Africa to participate at the Paralympic Games. Many members of the team went to London having survived or having had family who survived the Rwandan genocide.  Two member of the national squad lost limbs fighting against those who committed the 1992 genocide.  One of those team members who lost a leg was Dominique Bizimana.

Roster

Group play

9th/10th place classification

See also

  Rwanda at the 2012 Summer Olympics

References

Nations at the 2012 Summer Paralympics
2012
2012 in Rwandan sport